Last Weekend is a 2005 Russian thriller directed by Pavel Sanayev.

Plot 
The film tells two intertwining stories: the relationship of a young man and a girl, as well as the story of a group of guys who decided to destroy the body of an accidentally deceased friend.

Cast 
 Ivan Stebunov as Kirill
 Tatyana Arntgolts as Katya
 Ilya Sokolovsky as Gleb
 Artyom Semakin as Mishka
 Rytis Skripka as Anton
 Yuriy Kutsenko
 Konstantin Isaev asGAI inspector
 A. Kuzkin
 Dmitriy Lyamochkin
 A. Nikolayev

References

External links 
 

2005 films
2000s Russian-language films
Russian thriller films